The red-bellied mosaic-tailed rat (Protochromys fellowsi) is a species of rodent in the family Muridae.  It is the only species in the genus Protochromys.
It is found only in Papua New Guinea.

References

Old World rats and mice
Rodents of Papua New Guinea
Mammals described in 1943
Taxa named by Martin Hinton
Taxonomy articles created by Polbot
Endemic fauna of Papua New Guinea
Rodents of New Guinea